Julien Trarieux (born 19 August 1992) is a French road cyclist and mountain biker, who last rode for UCI ProTeam .

Major results

Mountain bike

2010
 1st  National Junior XCO Championships
 2nd  UCI World Junior XCO Championships
2011
 2nd National Under-23 XCO Championships
2013
 1st  National Under-23 XCO Championships

Road

2017
 2nd Grand Prix du Pays d'Aix
 2nd Tour du Pays Lionnais
 3rd Circuit des 4 Cantons
2019
 4th Grand Prix d'Ouverture La Marseillaise
 9th Cholet-Pays de Loire
 9th Tour de Vendée
2021
 9th Paris–Tours

References

External links

Directvelo profile

1992 births
Living people
French male cyclists
Cyclists from Nice